Susan E. Lederer (born 1955) is an American historian of science. She is the Robert Turell Professor of Medical History and Bioethics at the University of Wisconsin–Madison. Lederer focuses on medicine and American society in the 20th-century. This includes the areas of race, medicine, public health, popular culture, research ethics, and the history of medical ethics. Lederer completed a B.A. in the history of science at Johns Hopkins University in 1977. She completed an M.A. (1979) and Ph.D. (1987) in the history of science at University of Wisconsin–Madison. Lederer's dissertation was titled Human experimentation and antivivisection in turn-of-the-century America. Her advisor was Ronald Numbers.

Selected works

Books

References 

Living people
1955 births
Place of birth missing (living people)
American historians of science
Johns Hopkins University alumni
University of Wisconsin–Madison alumni
University of Wisconsin–Madison faculty
American women historians
20th-century American historians
21st-century American historians
20th-century American women
21st-century American women